Pyramidion is a 5 track EP by English band Ozric Tentacles. It was released in 2001 on Snapper Music. Only the title track on this EP is a new song; the rest are older tunes recorded live at the Boardwalk in Sheffield, England.

Track listing
 "Pyramidion" - (6:21)
 "Xingu" (live) - (7:42)
 "Pixel Dream" (live) - (12:12)
 "Sultana Detrii" (live) - (9:18)
 "Aramanu" (live) - (5:50)

Personnel
 Ed Wynne – guitars, synthesizers, samps
 Seaweed (Christopher Lenox-Smith) – synthesizers
 John Egan – flutes
 Zia Geelani – bass
 Johnny Morgan – drums
 Rad (Conrad Prince) – drums

Trivia
A Pyramidion is the uppermost piece of an Egyptian pyramid.

References

Ozric Tentacles albums
2001 EPs